La insaciable (English: The Insatiable) is a Mexican telenovela produced by Televisa and broadcast by Telesistema Mexicano in 1961.

Cast 
 Carmen Montejo
 Lorenzo de Rodas
 Virginia Gutiérrez
 Alfonso Torres
 Alejandro Ciangherotti
 Alejandro Torres

References

External links 

Mexican telenovelas
1961 telenovelas
Televisa telenovelas
1961 Mexican television series debuts
1961 Mexican television series endings
Spanish-language telenovelas